Mohsin Changazi, (born 3 September 1979), is a Pakistani Urdu poet of Hazara descent. He has participated several poetry gatherings in Karachi, Lahore and Islamabad. He has also received awards including the Tamgha-e-Imtiaz in 2010.

Awards 
Tamgha-e-Imtiaz in 2010.
Nashan-i-ghazal Award
 Star of the Night
 Gold Medal and Shield.

References

Pakistani people of Hazara descent
Hazara poets
Pakistani poets
Urdu-language poets from Pakistan
1979 births
Living people
People from Quetta
Recipients of Tamgha-e-Imtiaz